Admiral James Fife Jr. (January 22, 1897 – November 1, 1975) was a United States Navy admiral who was promoted to four-star rank after retirement as a "tombstone admiral".

Biography
Fife graduated from the United States Naval Academy in 1918 and served in both World War I and World War II in submarines and surface combatants.

When the U. S. entered World War II, Admiral Fife was Chief of Staff of Submarine Squadron 20 in the Philippines (part of the Asiatic Fleet under Admiral T. C. Hart). After the squadron was dissolved into Submarines, Asiatic Fleet, he served as Chief of Staff to Admiral Hart until May 1942. About this time he and Captain J. E. Wilkes, his former squadron commander, were instrumental in identifying several deficiencies of the submarine force, especially the difficulties with the Mark 14 torpedo and the Hooven-Owens-Rentschler diesel engine. Fife would later conduct some of the experiments that isolated the Mark 14 torpedo's defective components in cooperation with Rear Admiral Charles A. Lockwood, then Commander, Submarines, Southwest Pacific.

In late 1942 he served with General MacArthur as the representative of Admiral A. S. Carpender during the Buna campaign. Following this he commanded the submarines of Task Force 42 (later Task Force 72) in Brisbane, Australia, where he meticulously planned and directed his submarines' missions. In 1944 Admiral Fife transferred to the staff of Commander in Chief, U.S. Fleet (COMINCH) Admiral Ernest J. King in Washington, D.C. as a war planner.

Admiral Fife was awarded the Navy Distinguished Service Medal for meritorious service as the Chief of Staff to Commander Submarines, Asiatic Fleet, the Air Medal (by the Army), and a Gold Star in lieu of a second Distinguished Service Medal for action in the Pacific area.

At the close of 1944 he returned to Australia as Commander, Submarines, Seventh Fleet; Commander, U.S. Naval Forces, Fremantle, Western Australia; and Commander Task Force 71. As a result, he was awarded a Gold Star in lieu of a third Distinguished Service Medal.

From April 1947 until 1950, he commanded the Submarine Force, Atlantic Fleet (COMSUBLANT). This assignment was followed by duty as Assistant Chief, and Deputy Chief of Naval Operations (Operations). His final assignment before retirement was as U. S. Naval Commander in Chief, Mediterranean, under Admiral Mountbatten, Royal Navy. Fife retired from the Navy in August 1955, and was promoted upon retirement to full admiral.

In retirement he served as the Director of Mystic Seaport museum in Stonington, Connecticut.  During his tenure at Mystic Seaport he oversaw a great expansion of the museum's exhibits and the refloating of the historic whaling ship Charles W. Morgan.

He died in 1975 and was buried in Arlington National Cemetery.

Legacy
Fife bequeathed his estate in Stonington to the U.S. Navy, which turned it into a recreational area. The park is located at 571 Stonington Road (U.S. Route 1). A commemorative plaque is located on the property.

Fife Hall, a navigation training facility at Naval Submarine Base New London is named in his honor.

The  (DD-991), commissioned 31 May 1980 and decommissioned in 2003, was named in his honor.

Awards
 Distinguished Service Medal with two gold stars 
 Air Medal
Yangtze Service Medal
 Victory Medal
 American Campaign Medal
 Asiatic-Pacific Campaign Medal
 World War Two Victory Medal
 American Defense Service Medal

See also

References

United States Navy admirals
United States Naval Academy alumni
United States Navy personnel of World War I
United States Navy World War II admirals
1897 births
1975 deaths
People from Reno, Nevada
Burials at Arlington National Cemetery
Recipients of the Air Medal
Recipients of the Navy Distinguished Service Medal
Military personnel from Nevada